Spanish orthography is the orthography used in the Spanish language. The alphabet uses the Latin script. The spelling is fairly phonemic, especially in comparison to more opaque orthographies like English, having a relatively consistent mapping of graphemes to phonemes; in other words, the pronunciation of a given Spanish-language word can largely be predicted from its spelling and to a slightly lesser extent vice versa. Spanish punctuation includes the use of inverted question and exclamation marks:  .

Spanish uses capital letters much less often than English; they are not used on adjectives derived from proper nouns (e.g. francés, español, portugués from Francia, España, and Portugal, respectively) and book titles capitalize only the first word (e.g. La rebelión de las masas).

Spanish uses only the acute accent, over any vowel: . This accent is used to mark the tonic (stressed) syllable, though it may also be used occasionally to distinguish homophones such as si ('if') and sí ('yes').

In contrast with English, Spanish has an official body that governs linguistic rules, orthography among them: the Royal Spanish Academy, which makes periodic changes to the orthography. The currently valid work on the orthography is the Ortografía de la lengua española, published in 2010.

Alphabet in Spanish
The Spanish language is written using the Spanish alphabet, which is the Latin script with one additional letter:  , for a total of 27 letters. Each letter has a single official name according to the Real Academia Española's new 2010 Common Orthography, but in some regions alternative traditional names coexist as explained below.

 The digraph  represents the affricate . The digraph was formerly treated as a single letter, called che.

 The digraph  (e.g. ) represents the palatal lateral  in a few dialects; but in most dialects—because of the historical merger called yeísmo—it, like the letter , represents the phoneme .

 The exact realization of nasals in syllable-final position depends on phonetic attributes of following consonants (even across word boundaries) so that  can represent a nasal that is labial (as in ánfora), palatal (as in cónyuge), velar (as in rincón), etc. In rare instances, word-final  is used, but there is no actual pronunciation difference.

 Used only in the digraph .

 The digraph , which only appears between vowels, represents the trill .

 Old orthography with the letter  representing  has been preserved in some proper names such as México.

For details on Spanish pronunciation, see Spanish phonology and Help:IPA/Spanish.

This makes a difference when sorting alphabetically:  appears in dictionaries after . For example, in a Spanish dictionary  comes after .

Thus, for example, in dictionaries, chico is alphabetized after centro and before ciudad, instead of being alphabetized after all words beginning with cu- as was formerly done.

Despite their former status as unitary letters of the alphabet,  and  have always been treated as sequences with regard to the rules of capitalization. Thus the word  in a text written in all caps is CHILLÓN, not *ChILlÓN, and if it is the first word of a sentence, it is written Chillón, not *CHillón. Sometimes, one finds lifts with buttons marked , but this double capitalization has always been incorrect according to RAE rules.

This is the list of letters from most to least frequent in Spanish texts: ; the vowels make up around 45% of the text.

Alternative names

B and V
In Old Spanish, they likely represented different sounds but the sounds merged later. Their usual names are be and uve; in some regions, speakers may instead add something to the names to distinguish them. Some Mexicans and most Peruvians generally say   / chica ('big B' / 'little V'); Argentines, Uruguayans and Chileans, be larga / corta ('long B' / 'short V'). Regardless of these regional differences, all Spanish-speaking people recognize be as the official name of B.
R
The name  was used when referring specifically to the alveolar tap  and  referring to the alveolar trill . As a referent to the trill sound rather than the phoneme,  can refer to a single or double .
W
In Colombia, Mexico, and in some Central American countries, because of English acculturation, the letter is usually called  (like English "double u"). In Spain it is usually called . 
I
Y
Using  as the only name for the letter is one of the newest proposed changes specified by the 2010 new common orthography.
Z

Other characters
Besides the letters, other characters are specially associated with Spanish-language texts:
 The currency symbols of Spanish-language countries:  (centavo),  (colón),  (peseta),  (peso),  (Paraguayan guaraní).
 , abbreviation of cada una ('each one')
N.º (número, 'number') can be represented as one character .
  is the symbol of the arroba, a pre-metric unit of weight (about 11.502 kg, 25.3 pounds).
They are also used in the middle of a sentence if only part of the sentence is a question or exclamation:  ("John started eating and wow!")

Orthography

Orthographic principles
These orthographic rules are similar to, but not the same as, those of other Romance languages of the Iberian Peninsula, such as Portuguese, Catalan and Galician.

The converse does not always hold, i.e. for a given pronunciation there may be multiple possible spellings, as a result of decisions by the Royal Spanish Academy. The main issues are:
the silent ;
the occasional use of accents to distinguish two words that sound the same, such as tú /tu, sí / si, and más / mas.

In addition, for speakers in Latin America and south of Spain:

In particular, using  in many cases is not a living continuation of Old Spanish (which often had  in place of intervocalic  as a result of Vulgar Latin merger, as in other Romance languages), but an artificial restitution based on Latin:  'horse' is spelled as Latin  and unlike French , Italian , Portuguese , or Catalan . Additionally,  is a purely orthographical sign used before word-initial rising diphthongs. However, in some words RAE mandated counteretymological spellings because of established tradition of usage, e. g. <.

In some Spanish verbs, the same stem is spelled differently before different verb endings. This is required to keep the regularity of the conjugated forms in terms of sound, when a letter represents different sounds, or to avoid unusual combinations, such as -ze- or -zi-:
 : c—qu:  >  (-car),  >  (-quir).
 : z—c:  >  (-zar),  >  (-cer).
 : g—j:  > . But in verbs ending in -jar, the j is kept before e:  >  (not ).
 : g—gu:  >  (-gar),  >  (-guir).
 : gu—gü:  >  (-guar).

Likewise, words with a stem ending in z change this letter to c before e and i in their forms and derivatives:  — ,  — .

Letter-to-sound correspondences

Consonants

Vowels

The phoneme  is realized as an approximant in all contexts except after a pause, a nasal, or a lateral. In these environments, it may be 
realized as an affricate. The approximant allophone differs from non-syllabic  in a number of ways; it has a lower F2 amplitude, is longer, can only appear in the syllable onset (including word-initially, where non-syllabic  normally never appears), is a palatal fricative in emphatic pronunciations, and is unspecified for rounding (e.g. viuda  'widow' vs ayuda  'help'). The two also overlap in distribution after  and : enyesar  ('to plaster') aniego  ('flood'). Although there is dialectal and ideolectal variation, speakers may also exhibit other near-minimal pairs like abyecto ('abject') vs abierto ('opened').

In a number of varieties, including some American ones, a process parallel to the one distinguishing non-syllabic  from consonantal  occurs for non-syllabic  and a rare consonantal . Near-minimal pairs include deshuesar  ('to debone') vs. desuello  ('skinning'), son huevos  ('they are eggs') vs son nuevos  ('they are new'), and huaca  ('Indian grave') vs u oca  ('or goose').

Doubling of vowels and consonants
Vowels in Spanish can be doubled to represent a hiatus of two identical vowels: leer, chiita, loor, duunviro. This especially happens in prefixed and compound words: portaaviones, sobreesfuerzo, microorganismo. However, in this case simplification of double vowels is also mostly allowed: portaviones, sobresfuerzo, microrganismo. Simplification is not allowed when it would change the meaning: archiilegal ('arch-illegal') but archilegal ('arch-legal').

Exceptions to this limitation are gamma (and its derivatives gammaglobulina, gammagrafía), digamma, kappa, atto-, as well as unadapted foreign words (including proper names) and their derivations (see below). When a double consonant other than nn or bb would appear on a morpheme border, it is simplified: digámoselo for digamos+se+lo, exilofonista for ex+xilofonista. However, the combination sal+le is pronounced with a prolonged l and has no correct spelling according to the current orthography.

Optional omission of a consonant in consonant combination
In some words, one of consonants in a consonant combination may optionally be omitted. This includes Greek-derived words such as /, / (mostly pronounced without consonant clusters foreign to Spanish but more commonly spelled with them) and other words such as /, /, /.

The letter Y
The letter  is consistently used in the consonantal value. The use of the letter  for a vowel or a semivowel is very restricted. The diphthongs  are usually written  at the end of words (e. g. hay, ley, voy), though exceptions may occur in loanwords (e.g. bonsái, agnusdéi). The letter  is conserved in rarely used encliticized verbal forms like ,  (it is more normal to say te doy, las hay). The letter  is used for the vowel  in the conjunction y and in some acronyms, like pyme (from pequeña y mediana empresa). Derivatives of foreign proper names also conserve : taylorismo, from Taylor.

Special and modified letters

The vowels can be marked with an acute accent——for two purposes: to mark stress if it does not follow the most common pattern, or to differentiate words that are otherwise spelled identically (called the tilde diacrítica in Spanish). The accented  is found only in some proper names: Aýna, Laýna, Ýñiguez.

The diaeresis may occur also in Spanish poetry, occasionally, over either vowel of a diphthong, to indicate an irregular disyllabic pronunciation required by the meter (to be pronounced as three syllables).

There are no native words in Spanish with the combination  nor ; again,  is used instead.

Keyboard requirements

As implemented on the mechanical typewriter, the keyboard contained a single dead key, with the acute accent  in the lowercase position, and the diaeresis  in the uppercase position. A separate key provided . (A dead key "~" is used on the Spanish and Portuguese keyboards, but on the Latin American keyboard the "~" is not a dead key). The inverted marks  and  completed the required minimum. (These symbols are used for ordinal numbers:  for primero,  for segunda, etc.)

As implemented in the MS-DOS operating system and its successor Microsoft Windows, a / pair—not required in Spanish but needed for Catalan, Portuguese, and French—is typically added, and the use of the acute accent and diaeresis with capital letters is supported.

On a USA or UK physical keyboard, all of the Spanish characters are present using the US-International layout.

Stress and accentuation

Stress in Spanish is marked unequivocally through a series of orthographic rules. Words that do not follow the default stress have an acute accent over the stressed vowel. The written accent may thus appear only in certain forms of a word and not others, for example andén, plural andenes. In many cases, the accent is essential to understanding what a word means, for example hablo ('I speak') as opposed to habló ('he/she/you spoke').

For purposes of counting syllables and assigning stress in Spanish, where an unmarked high vowel is followed by another vowel the sequence is treated as a rising diphthong, counted as a single syllable—unlike Portuguese and Catalan, which tend to treat such a sequence as two syllables. A syllable is of the form XAXX, where X represents a consonant, permissible consonant cluster, or no sound at all, and A represents a vowel, diphthong, or triphthong. The letter  is not considered an interruption between vowels (so that  is considered to have two syllables: ahu-mar; this may vary in some regions, where  is used as a hiatus or diphthong-broking mark for unstressed vowels, so the pronunciation would be then a-hu-mar, though that trait is gradually disappearing).

An accent over the high vowel ( or ) of a vowel sequence prevents it from being a diphthong (i.e., it signals a hiatus): for example,  and  have two syllables each.

If the diphthongs  are written  at the end of words, the letter  is considered a consonant letter for the purpose of accentuation: , .

A word with preantepenultimate stress (on the fourth last syllable) or earlier does not have a common linguistic term in English, but in Spanish receives the name . All proparoxytones and sobresdrújulas have a written accent mark.

In the pronunciation of these adverbs—as with all adverbs in —primary stress is on the ending, on the penultimate syllable. The original stress of the adjective—whether marked, as in fácilmente, or not marked, as in libremente—may be manifested as a secondary stress in the adverb.

Pre-1999 orthographic rules treated such words as disyllabic, thus guión. The orthographic rules of 1999 admitted the two accentuations guion and guión, corresponding to two different pronunciations. The orthographic rules of 2010 declared that for orthographic purposes such words should be considered monosyllabic, so the correct spelling is now guion.

Accentuation of capital letters
The Real Academia Española indicates that accents are required on capitals (but not when the capitals are used in acronyms).

Differential accents

In eight cases, the written accent is used to distinguish stressed monosyllabic words from clitics:

The written accent in the word té is conserved in its plural: tés.

However, names of letters and musical notes are written without the accent, even if they have homonymous clitics: a, de, e, o, te, u; mi, la, si.

The written accent is also used in the interrogative pronouns to distinguish them from relative pronouns (which are pronounced the same but unstressed):

 'Where are you going?'
 'Where you cannot find me.'

Up until 2010,  was used when applied to numbers:  ('7 or 9'), to avoid possible confusion with the digit 0.

The differential accent is sometimes used in demonstrative pronouns (e. g.  'this one') to distinguish them from demonstrative determiners (e. g.  'this') and in the adverb  'only' to distinguish it from the adjective . However, the current position of the RAE is not to use accent in these words regardless of their meaning (as they are always stressed), except in cases of possible ambiguity (and even then it is recommended to rephrase, avoiding the accented spellings of these words entirely).

Foreign words
Loanwords in Spanish are usually written according to Spanish spelling conventions (extranjerismos adaptados): e.g. pádel, fútbol, chófer, máster, cederrón ('CD-ROM'). However, some foreign words (extranjerismos crudos) are used in Spanish texts in their original forms, not conforming to Spanish orthographic conventions: e.g. ballet, blues, jazz, jeep, lady, pizza, sheriff, software. The RAE prescribes extranjerismos crudos to be written in italics in a text printed in roman type, and vice versa, and in quotation marks in a manuscript text or when italics are not available:

Spanish-speakers use both English-style and angled quotation marks, so the above example could also be written as follows: 

This typographical emphasis is prescribed by the RAE since 1999. In practice, this RAE prescription is not always followed.

This typographical emphasis is not used for foreign proper names and their derivations with the suffixes -iano, -ismo, -ista; nor is it used for some Spanish derivations of extranjerismos crudos, such as pizzería.

According to the current Ortografía, Latin expressions (e. g. curriculum vitae, grosso modo) are treated as unadapted foreign words, so they are also typographically emphasized. From 1870 to 2010, Latin expressions in Spanish texts were accentuated according to the Spanish orthographical rules (e. g. currículum vítae) and not typographically emphasized. Some Latin expressions have become single words in Spanish: , . These words are not typographically emphasized.

For foreign names from non-Latin-script languages, using Spanish orthographic transcription is recommended: Al-Yazira, Menájem Beguín.

Capitalization
Capitalization in Spanish is sparse compared to English.

In general, only personal and place names, some abbreviations (e.g. Sr. López, but  López); the first word (only) in the title of a book, movie, song, etc. (except when the title contains only two words, then the second word is also sometimes capitalized); and the first word in a sentence are capitalized, as are names of companies, government bodies, celebrations, periodicals, etc. Some geographical names have a capitalized article: El Salvador, but los Estados Unidos. Capitalized article is also used in names of periodicals, such as El País, El Nuevo Diario. Some nouns have capital letters when used in a special administrative sense: Estado 'state' (sovereign polity), but estado 'state' (political division; condition). Nomenclature terms in geographical names are written in lowercase: el mar Mediterráneo 'the Mediterranean Sea'. According to the current Ortografía, geographical names of the type "nomenclature term + adjective from another name of the same geographical object" are not capitalized at all: la península ibérica 'the Iberian Peninsula', because ibérica comes from Iberia, another name of the same peninsula (although mainly used in a historical context).

Adjectives from geographical names, names of nationalities or languages are not capitalized, nor (in standard style) are days of the week and months of the year.

Writing words together and separately
The following words are written together:
 the conjunction  ('because') and the noun  ('reason');
 combinations of verbs with enclitic pronouns, such as  'delivering it to me' from  'delivering' +  'me' +  'it'.

The following word combinations are written separately:
 the interrogative  ('why');
 combinations of prefixes and word combinations:  (but).

Coordinated compound adjectives are written with a hyphen: .

Syllabification
Spanish words are divided into syllables using the following rules:

1. A vowel between two consonants always ends the first syllable and the second consonant begins another: pá-ja-ro. Put differently, if a vowel follows a consonant, the consonant, not the vowel, must begin the new syllable.

2. If a vowel is followed by two consonants, the syllables divide between the consonants: can-tar, ver-ter, án-da-le. However, ch, ll, rr and combinations of b, c, d, f, g, k, p, t plus r or l do not divide: pe-rro, lu-char, ca-lle, pro-gra-ma, ha-blar. Exceptionally, r and l after a consonant can begin a new syllable in prefixed or compound words: sub-ra-yar, sub-lu-nar, ciu-dad-re-a-le-ño.

3. Two vowels may form a hiatus or a diphthong (see the section "Stress and accentuation" above): pa-e-lla, puen-te, ra-íz. Three vowels may sometimes form a triphthong: es-tu-diáis.

4. The silent h is not taken into account when syllabifying words. Two vowels separated by an h may form a hiatus or a diphthong: ahu-mar, de-sahu-cio, bú-ho.

The combination tl in the middle of words may be divided into syllables in two ways: at-le-ta or a-tle-ta, corresponding to the pronunciations [að̞ˈle.t̪a] (more common in Spain) and [aˈt̪le.t̪a] (more common in Latin America).

These rules are used for hyphenating words at the end of line, with the following additional rules:

1. One letter is not hyphenated. So, the word abuelo is syllabified a-bue-lo, but the only way to hyphenate it at the end of a line is abue-lo.

2. Hiatuses are not divided at the end of line. So, the word paella is syllabified as pa-e-lla, but the only way to hyphenate it at the end of a line is pae-lla. This rule includes hiatuses with an intervening silent h: alcohol is syllabified as al-co-hol, but the only way to hyphenate it at the end of a line is al-cohol. On the other hand, the name Mohamed contains a pronounced h, so the hyphenation Mo-hamed is accepted. See also rule 3 containing an exception to this rule.

3. Prefixed and compound words may be divided phonetically (corresponding to the above rules) or morphologically (the border between morphemes is considered a border between syllables): bie-nestar or bien-estar, inte-racción or inter-acción, reins-talar or re-instalar. This rule is not valid for compounds in which one part is not used as an independent word or for words with unproductive prefixes: pun-tiagudo (not *punti-agudo), arzo-bispo (not *arz-obispo).

4. Unusual combinations containing the letter h are not permitted at the beginning of a line: sulfhí-drico (not *sul-fhídrico), brah-mán (not *bra-hmán).

The letter x between vowels phonetically represents two consonants separated by a syllable border, but hyphenation at the end of line is permitted before the x: ta-xi, bo-xeo.

Words written with hyphen are hyphenated by repeating the hyphen on the following line: teórico-/-práctico. Repeating the hyphen is not necessary if the hyphenated word is a proper name where a hyphen is followed by a capital letter.

Abbreviations, symbols, acronyms
Hyphenating abbreviations (including contractions) at the end of line is not allowed and putting them in separate lines with terms they accompany is not allowed.

Traditional exceptions: the plural of pta. is pts., that of cent. and cént. is cts., and that of Ud. or Vd. is Uds. or Vds.

Letter symbols such as those of chemical elements or measurement units are written following international conventions and do not require the abbreviation period: H, kg. For some notions, Spanish-specific symbols are used: O ( 'west'), sen ( 'sine').

Acronyms are written in all capitals and read by letters ( for organización no gubernamental 'non-governmental organization') or as words ( for Organización de las Naciones Unidas). Some acronyms read by letters may also be spelled according to their pronunciation: . Acronyms written in all capitals are not pluralized in writing, but they are pluralized in speech: las ONG [las o.e.neˈxes] 'the non-governmental organizations'.

Numerals
Numbers may be written in words (uno, dos, tres...) or in figures (1, 2, 3, ...).

For the decimal separator, the comma and the point are both accepted (3,1416 or 3.1416); the decimal comma is preferred in Spain, Argentina, Chile, Colombia, Ecuador, Paraguay, Peru, and Uruguay, but the decimal point is preferred in Mexico, the Dominican Republic, Guatemala, Honduras, Nicaragua, Panama, Puerto Rico, and Venezuela. Both marks are used in Bolivia, Costa Rica, Cuba, and El Salvador.

For the thousands separator, the currently standard mark is the thin space (123 456 789). Formerly, the point was sometimes used, but now it is not recommended.

When written in words, numbers up to 30 are nowadays written as a single word, e.g. , . The corresponding ordinal numbers may be written as a single word or separately, e.g. Numbers more than 30 (cardinal and ordinal) are usually written separately, e.g.

Whole hundreds are also written as single words, e.g. .

Daytime is written in the 24-hour format, using the colon (18:45) or the point (18.45). Dates are expressed in the day-month-year format, with the following options possible: 8 de mayo de 2015; 8-5-2015; 8-5-15; 8/5/2015; 8.5.2015; 8-V-2015. Leading zeros in the day and the month (08.05.2015) are not used, except in computerized or bank documents.

Roman numerals (I, II, III, ...) are used for centuries (e. g. siglo ) and for regnal numbers (e. g. Luis XIV). Roman or Arabic numerals may be used for historical dynasties (e. g. la  dinastía or la 18.ª dinastía); volumes, chapters, or other parts of books (e. g. tomo , tomo 3.º, 3.er tomo, or tomo 3); celebrations (e. g. XXIII Feria del Libro de Buenos Aires, or 23.ª Feria...). Roman numerals are typeset in small capitals if they would not be capitalized when written in words.

History
The Real Academia Española has reformed the orthographic rules of Spanish several times.

In Old Spanish,  was used to represent the voiceless palatal sound  (as in  'he/she said'), while  represented the voiced palatal  (as in  'son'). This results in some words that originally contained  now containing , most easily seen in the case of those with English cognates, such as ejercicio, "exercise".

A notable case is the word  used in biochemistry, meaning "enzyme", as different from  meaning "on", "over" or "on top of" something.

, now ).

In orthography, the distinction was suppressed in 1763.

,  (these forms appeared in the Ortografía, but the Diccionario did not put the diaeresis in these words).

" → "). This was mostly done in 1754, but some exceptions persisted until 1803.

An earlier usage had  as a word initial . It is only maintained in the archaic spelling of proper names like Yglesias or Ybarra. Although the RAE has always used the word-initial I as needed, the use of Y is occasionally found in handwriting and inscriptions up to the middle of the 19th century.

In early printing, the long s  was a different version of  used at the beginning or in the middle of a word. In Spain, the change to use the familiar round s everywhere, as in the current usage, was mainly accomplished between the years 1760 and 1766; for example, the multi-volume España Sagrada made the switch with volume 16 (1762).

From 1741 to 1815, the circumflex was used over vowels to indicate that preceding  and  should be pronounced /k/ and /ks/ respectively and not /tʃ/ and /x/, e.g. , .

The use of accent marks in printing varies by period, due to reforms successively promulgated by the Spanish Royal Academy. In early RAE publications (RAE statutes of 1715, Diccionario de autoridades of 1726), the acute accent was used extensively (e. g. Real Académia Españóla), although it was not used in paroxytones with two or more consonants after the stressed vowel, in most two-syllable paroxytones, and in some other words. (However, the Diccionario de autoridades, unlike the RAE statutes and later RAE publications, does not put accents on the capital letters.) In 1880, the rules were simplified: grammatical considerations were no longer taken into account, except for differential accents. As a result, many words spelled previously without the accent gained it. These include words with final stress ending in -n (e.g. ,); verbs in the imperfect tense (e.g.); the possessives mío and mía and the word . On the other hand, some words lost their accent mark, e. g.   → ,   → . Meanwhile, one-letter words other than the conjunction y—namely the preposition a and the conjunctions e (the form of y before an [i] sound), o, and u (form of o before [o])—were written with the grave accent (à, è, ò, ù) in early RAE publications and with the acute accent (á, é, ó, ú) from 1741 to 1911.

The Ortografía 1754 and later editions also stated that surnames ending in -ez are not accented, though pronounced as paroxytones, e. g. Perez, Enriquez. The Prontuario 1853 and later editions did not mention surnames ending in -ez explicitly (but Perez occurs in capitalization rules), but stated that oxytone surnames are accented (e. g. Ardanáz, Muñíz) except when homonymous to nouns, adjectives, geographical names, or verb infinitives (e. g. Calderon, Leal, Teruel, Escalar). The Gramática 1870 stated that surnames ending in consonant and traditionally written without the accent are sometimes pronounced as paroxytones (e. g. Gutierrez, Aristizabal) and sometimes as oxytones (e. g. Ortiz) and recommends following the general rule for accentuation of surnames. The Gramática 1880 follows the general rule for accentuation of surnames: Enríquez, Fernández.

The spelling  was not changed, as pronouncing this word with a diphthong (/de.ˈsau.θjo/ instead of the former pronunciation /de.sa.ˈu.θjo/) came to be considered the norm.

History of differential accents:

 Ortografía 1754: dé, sé, sí.
 Ortografía 1763: dé, sé, sí, él, mí.
 The word tú is accented in the Diccionario since 1783.
 Accented interrogatives appear in the Diccionario from 1817.
 The word té is accented in the Diccionario from 1832; the accent disappeared after 1880 and reappeared in 1925.
 The word más is accented in the Prontuario since 1853.
 The Prontuario 1853 also added luégo (as an adverb) and the verb forms éntre, pára, sóbre; the Gramática 1870 also added nós (as majestic 'we'), and the musical notes mí, lá, sí. These accents were abolished by the Gramática 1880.
 The Gramática 1870 also mentions the obsolete pronoun ál ('another thing'), which is also mentioned in the Diccionario since 1869.
 The demonstrative pronouns éste, ése, aquél appear accented since the Prontuario 1853. However, the norms of 1952 stated that they may be not accented except in the case of ambiguity and also extended the possibility of accentuating to other similar words such as otro, algunos, pocos, muchos; this extension was abolished by the revision of 1959.
 The adverb sólo is mentioned by the Prontuario 1853, but not by the Gramática 1870. The Gramática 1880 states that the word is accented "by the common usage" (por costumbre). The norms of 1952 made the accent on sólo mandatory, but their revision of 1959 stated the accent in sólo is not normally needed, but can be used in the cases of ambiguity. The Ortografía 1999 states that the accent in sólo may be used, but it is necessary only in the cases of ambiguity. The Ortografía 2010 recommends not to accent the demonstratives and solo, but the DLE 2014 states that they may be accented in cases of ambiguity.
Since the Gramática 1880, they are spelled aun and aún.

The names of numbers in the upper teens and the twenties were originally written as three words (e.g.   ,  y ), but nowadays they are spelled as a single word (e.g.). For the numbers from 21 to 29, the "fused" forms are accepted since 1803 and became common over the second half of the 19th century. For those from 16 to 19, the one-word forms became accepted in 1925 and took the lead in the 1940s. The Diccionario panhispánico de dudas (2005) labeled the separate spelling as obsolete. Fusing of number-names above 30 (e.g.) is rare, but accepted by the DPD 2005 and the Ortografía 2010 besides the usual separate spelling: , .

In the 18th century, the letter  was used in a few loanwords and also in the word kalendario (following the Latin spelling Kalendae); however, the first edition of the Diccionario de la lengua castellana (1780) already spelled calendario. In the  eighth edition of the Ortografía de la lengua castellana (1815), the letter  was deleted from the Spanish alphabet. However, the letter was reinstated in the fourth edition of the Prontuario de ortografía de la lengua castellana (1853), and its use in loanwords was reallowed.

The letter  was formerly considered unneeded for writing Spanish. However, in the Ortografía of 1969, RAE included  into the Spanish alphabet, allowing its use in loanwords.

In 1999, the written accent was added to a few words ending on the stressed diphthong au or eu:  became . Before 1999, the combinations of accented verb forms with enclitic pronouns conserved the written accent, but now they do not if the general rules of accentuation do not require it:  →  ( + ),  →  ( + ).

Reform proposals

In spite of the relatively regular orthography of Spanish, there have been several initiatives to simplify it further. Andrés Bello succeeded in making his proposal official in several South American countries, but they later returned to the standard set by the Real Academia Española.
Another proposal, Ortografía R̃asional Ispanoamerikana, remained a curiosity.
The Academies, however, from time to time have made minor changes in the orthography (see above).

A Mexican Spanish convention is to spell certain indigenous words with  rather than the  that would be the standard spelling in Spanish. This is generally due to the origin of the word (or the present pronunciation) containing the voiceless postalveolar fricative  sound or another sibilant that is not used in modern standard Spanish. The Real Academia Española recommends this spelling.

Punctuation

Punctuation in Spanish is generally similar to punctuation in English and other European languages, but has some differences.

Spanish has the unusual feature of indicating the beginning of an interrogative or exclamatory sentence or phrase with inverted variants of the question mark and exclamation mark ([¿] and [¡]), respectively. Most languages that use the Latin alphabet (including Spanish) use question and exclamation marks at the end of sentences and clauses. These inverted forms appear additionally at the beginning of these sentences or clauses. For example, the English phrase "How old are you?" has just the final question mark, while the Spanish equivalent,  begins with an inverted question mark.

The inverted question and exclamation marks were gradually adopted following the Real Academia's recommendations in the second edition of the Ortografía de la lengua castellana in 1754. Originally, the usage of inverted marks at the beginning was recommended only for large sentences, but the Gramática of 1870 made them mandatory for all interrogative or exclamatory sentences.

The inverted question and exclamation marks may be used at the beginning of a clause in the middle of a sentence, for example:  ('If you cannot go with them, would you like to go with us?').

Sentences that are interrogative and exclamative at the same time may be written with two signs on each side: ¿¡...!? or ¡¿...?! or with one sign on each side: ¡...? or ¿...!

However, parenthesized signs to show doubt or surprise are written as single signs: (?) (!). Doubtful dates may be written with single or double signs: 1576? or ¿1576?

The period indicates the end of the sentence.

The comma is used for separating appositions, subordinate clauses, interjections, tags in tag questions, vocatives, and discursives. It is also used in enumerations, but the serial comma is not used in Spanish:  ('Spain, France() and Portugal'). There are some cases in which the comma after a coordinating conjunction, such as complex sentences. Circumstantial complements are usually not separated by a comma.

The semicolon is used for a more significant pause then the comma. It may mean an intermediate division between the comma and the period or separate parts of a sentence which already contain commas.

The colon is used for generalizing words before enumerations, for exemplifications, before the direct speech. Sometimes it can be used for juxtaposing clauses (similar to the semicolon), after discursives, and in titles of the type "general: special". The colon is the standard mark in Spanish for addressing people in letters (Estimado profesor:, Querido amigo:); using the comma in this case is considered nonstandard.

The parentheses are used to include parenthetical information. When an entire sentence is parenthesized, the period is placed after the parentheses: (Esta es una frase parentética).

The square brackets are used for writing editor's words inside citations and instead of parentheses inside parentheses.

The dash may be used to write direct speech in dialogues, as a quotation dash. Two dashes can sometimes introduce parenthetical constructions. The dash can also be used as a marker in enumerations. The combination "period+dash" may be used to separate the name of the topic and other information, or to separate characters' names and their lines in theatrical works.

The quotation marks (for citations, direct speech, words in unusual form or meaning) are used in three styles: angled quotation marks (« ») for the outer level, double quotation marks (“ ”) for the inner level, single quotation marks (‘ ’) for the third level. This is the system preferred in Spain, whereas Latin American publications often do not use the angled quotation marks. When a closing quotation mark occurs together with another punctuation mark, it is placed after the quotation mark.

The ellipsis is used for marking a sudden pause or suspension in thought and for incomplete citations. The combination "ellipsis+period" is simplified to the ellipsis, but the abbreviation point remains before the ellipsis. When an ellipsis occurs together with another punctuation mark, then the comma, the semicolon, and the colon are placed after the ellipsis, but other punctuation marks may be placed before or after the ellipsis depending on the structure of the sentence.

Arabic alphabet
In the 15th and 16th centuries, dialectal Spanish (as well as Portuguese and Ladino) was sometimes written in the Arabic alphabet by Moriscos. This form of writing is called aljamiado.

See also
 Inverted question and exclamation marks
 Spanish manual alphabet
 Chilean manual alphabet

References

Bibliography

Ortografía de la lengua española published by the Real Academia Española (RAE).

External links

A la nación española: Sobre reformas ortográficas, Mariano Cubí i Soler, Imprenta de Miguel i Jaime Gaspar, Barcelona, 1852 (Biblioteca Digital Hispánica).
Collation in Spanish
Spanish Alphabet Pronunciation – simplified for beginners to Spanish letter pronunciation.

Orthography
Indo-European Latin-script orthographies